Amir Ansari is an American Chief Technology Officer and Co-Founder of Prodea Systems.

Along with his sister-in-law Anousheh Ansari, he made a multimillion-dollar contribution to the Ansari X Prize foundation on May 5, 2004, the 43rd anniversary of Alan Shepard's sub-orbital spaceflight. The X Prize was officially renamed the Ansari X Prize in honor of their donation.

Born in 1970 in Tehran, Iran, Ansari immigrated to the United States before the Iranian Revolution. He received his Bachelor of Science degree in electrical engineering and computer science at George Mason University. Amir, along with his brother Hamid and Anousheh, founded Telecom Technologies, Inc. (TTI) in 1993, and served as the company's CTO. TTI was acquired by Sonus Networks, Inc. in January 2001.

Prodea has announced the formation of a partnership with Space Adventures, Ltd. and the Federal Space Agency of the Russian Federation (FSA) to create a fleet of suborbital spaceflight vehicles for global commercial use.

References

21st-century American businesspeople
Iranian emigrants to the United States
People from Tehran
Living people
George Mason University alumni
American electrical engineers
Ansari X Prize
Chief technology officers
21st-century American inventors
Year of birth missing (living people)